KTYJ-LP was a low-power television station in Coeur d'Alene, Idaho, broadcasting locally in analog on UHF channel 58.    After selling KTYJ to CBOI it became an affiliate of America One. Founded July 9, 1990, the station was owned by Christian Broadcasting of Idaho, Inc.

History
The station began when the FCC issued an original construction permit to King Broadcasting Company for K58DQ. On December 3, 1992, King Broadcasting sold the construction permit to David C. Derryberry, who brought the station on air under Program Test Authority on February 22, 1994, with the license to follow on April 1, 1994. Channel 58 was an independent UHF television station owned and operated by David Derryberry Sr.carrying a program line up syndicated programs of that time including the New Price is Right, Magnum PI, Airwolf, Wonder Years, A-Team and many more.  First Run movies, Children's programming and the Seattle Mariners were popular programs.  The Station had live satellite feeds from around the nation.   The program schedule included a satellite feed from Family Net (FAMNET) from midnight until 9;00AM when the changed to in-house programming.

During the construction KTYJ-58, KREM-TV in Spokane contracted with Mr. David Derryberry Sr. to use KTYJ's main studio as its North Idaho News Room.  The two studios were linked via a microwave link, (STL) from Canfield Butte in Coeur d' Alene to Spokane.  When KTYJ-58 started its normal broadcast service, this arrangement between KREM-2 and KTYJ-58 remained until David Derryberry Sr. sold the television station.

The station broadcast syndicated family programming as well as the Seattle Mariners and had its own local evening newscast. Within a few months after the initial broadcast Mr. Derryberry was able to secure a position on the local North Idaho Cable System on the Channel 22 slot. On June 9, 1997, the station took the call letters KTYJ-LP. Derryberry sold the station to Christian Broadcasting of Idaho, Inc. on December 21, 1998. After operating the station for a little more than two years, Christian Broadcasting of Idaho reached an agreement to sell the station to North Rocky Mountain Television. The FCC approved the transaction on April 30, 2001, but the sale was never consummated and Christian Broadcasting of Idaho remained as the station's owner. Subsequent FCC documents continued to show Christian Broadcasting of Idaho as the owners of KTYJ-LP. Since the unsuccessful sale attempt, the station has affiliated with America One.

On September 13, 2010, the FCC cancelled the station's license and deleted the KTYJ-LP call sign from its database.  Channel 58 was not within the new FCC allocation for digital DTV which ended at Channel 50. There were no vacant channels available for a move and channel 58 went silent one year earlier on July 13, 2009.

References

External links

TYJ-LP
Defunct television stations in the United States
Television channels and stations disestablished in 2009
Television channels and stations established in 1994
1994 establishments in Idaho
2009 disestablishments in Idaho
TYJ-LP